Thomas Jermyn may refer to:

 Sir Thomas Jermyn (died 1552), English knight
 Sir Thomas Jermyn (died 1645) (1573–1645), English MP, Governor of Jersey
 Thomas Jermyn (died 1659), his son, English MP
 Thomas Jermyn, 2nd Baron Jermyn (1633–1703), his son, English MP